Keith Alexander MacRae (born 5 February 1951) is a Scottish footballer, who played as a goalkeeper for Motherwell, Manchester City, Philadelphia Fury and Portland Timbers. He represented the Scottish League once, in 1970.

References

Sources
Keith MacRae, Motherwellnet.co.uk

 NASL stats

1951 births
Living people
Footballers from Glasgow
Scottish footballers
Association football goalkeepers
Association football utility players
Motherwell F.C. players
Manchester City F.C. players
Philadelphia Fury (1978–1980) players
Portland Timbers (1975–1982) players
Scottish Football League players
Scottish Football League representative players
English Football League players
Scottish expatriate footballers
Expatriate soccer players in the United States
North American Soccer League (1968–1984) players
North American Soccer League (1968–1984) indoor players
Scotland under-23 international footballers
Scottish expatriate sportspeople in the United States
People educated at Lanark Grammar School